The Trump–Lilly Farmstead is a historic farmstead located near Hinton, in Raleigh and Summers County, West Virginia. The property includes seven contributing buildings and one contributing site, representative of a frontier Appalachian farm.  The main house is a typical two-story southern farmhouse with a side-gabled roof.  The farm was sold to the National Park Service in 1988.

It was listed on the National Register of Historic Places in 1990.

References

External links

Farms on the National Register of Historic Places in West Virginia
Houses on the National Register of Historic Places in West Virginia
Houses in Summers County, West Virginia
Vernacular architecture in West Virginia
Houses in Raleigh County, West Virginia
National Register of Historic Places in New River Gorge National Park and Preserve
Historic American Buildings Survey in West Virginia
National Register of Historic Places in Raleigh County, West Virginia
Historic districts in Raleigh County, West Virginia
National Register of Historic Places in Summers County, West Virginia
Historic districts in Summers County, West Virginia
Historic districts on the National Register of Historic Places in West Virginia